Lepidozamia is a genus of two species of cycad, both endemic to Australia. They are native to rainforest climates in eastern Queensland and eastern New South Wales. They have a diploid chromosome number of 2n = 18.

Etymology
The name is derived from the Greek word lepis (λεπίς) meaning scale, which refers to the scale-like structure of the stem and leaf bases.

Species

A specimen of L. hopei is known as the tallest living cycad at 17.5 m tall. These cycads are generally unbranched, tall, and with persistent leaf bases. They are easily cultivated as ornamental plants and are relatively cold hardy; L. peroffskyana was first described by a specimen grown at St. Petersburg's botanical garden in 1857.

References

The Cycad Pages: Lepidozamia

 
Endemic flora of Australia
Cycadophyta of Australia